The Old Basilica of Guadalupe is a Roman Catholic apostolic building in Monterrey, Nuevo León state, México. It is located in the metropolitan area, just outside the city's downtown.

It is the former center for the Basilica of Guadalupe, replaced in the latter 20th century by the current Basilica of Guadalupe complex.

Its small edification (by today's standards) is barely 50 meters away from the present basilica.

Other Monterrey churches
Other notable Roman Catholic churches in the area are: Cathedral of Monterrey, La Purísima, the Chappel of the Sweet Names, La Salle, El Roble, the Sacred Heart and the present Basilica of Guadalupe.

Buildings and structures in Monterrey
Catholic Church in Mexico
Landmarks in Monterrey
National Monuments of Mexico
Basilica churches in Mexico
Shrines to the Virgin Mary
Tourist attractions in Monterrey